Echinolepis is a monotypic genus of flatworms belonging to the family Hymenolepididae. The only species is Echinolepis carioca.

The species is found in Europe, Northern America.

References

Cestoda
Monotypic platyhelminthes genera
Cestoda genera